Stade des Jeunes is a stadium located in Kananga, Democratic Republic of the Congo.  It has a seating capacity of 10,000 spectators.  It serves as the home of US Tshinkunku and AS Saint-Luc of the Linafoot and Linafoot Ligue 2, respectively.

External links
Stadium information

Football venues in the Democratic Republic of the Congo